Boscombe East and Pokesdown is a ward in Bournemouth, Dorset. Since 2019, the ward has elected 2 councillors to Bournemouth, Christchurch and Poole Council.

History 
The ward covers most of the area of the former ward of Boscombe East, which elected three councillors to Bournemouth Borough Council.

Geography 

The ward includes the suburb of Pokesdown, and the eastern areas of Boscombe. It is part of the parliamentary constituency of Bournemouth East.

Councillors

Election results

References 

Wards of Bournemouth, Christchurch and Poole